The Episcopal Diocese of Northwestern Pennsylvania, originally the Episcopal Diocese of Erie is one of the 100 Dioceses of the Episcopal Church in the United States of America.  The diocese is made up of 32 congregations located in the 13 contiguous counties of northwest Pennsylvania. The diocese itself is split into four deaneries:  Northeast (Forest, McKean, and Warren Counties), Northwest (Erie County), Southeast (Cameron County; Clarion County, except Foxburg Borough; Clearfield County, except Morris Township; Elk County; and Jefferson County), and Southwest (Crawford, Lawrence, Mercer, and Venango Counties and Foxburg Borough of Clarion County). Its diocesan offices are located at 145 West Sixth Street, Erie, PA 16501, across the street from Gannon University. Its cathedral church is the Cathedral of Saint Paul, located at 134 West Seventh Street, Erie, PA 16501.

Bishops 
 Rogers Israel (1911-1921)
 John C. Ward (1921-1943)
 Edward Pinkney Wroth (1943-1946)
 Harold E. Sawyer (1946-1951)
 William Crittenden (1952-1973)
 Donald J. Davis (1974-1991)
 Robert D. Rowley (1991-2006)
 Sean W. Rowe (2007–present)

Sean W. Rowe (b. 1975) is the eighth Episcopalian bishop of the Episcopal Diocese of Northwestern Pennsylvania. Rowe, then 32, was elected on May 9, 2007, to become bishop of the diocese. He was consecrated on September 8, 2007. He was, at the time of his consecration, the youngest bishop in the Episcopal Church in the United States of America.

Churches within the Diocese of Northwestern PA
 Cathedral of St. Paul (Erie, PA)
 Christ Church (Oil City, PA)
 Church of The Ascension (Bradford, PA)
 Church of The Epiphany (Grove City, PA)
 Church of The Holy Trinity (Houtzdale, PA)
 Church of the Holy Trinity (Brookville, PA)
 Church of our Saviour (DuBois, PA)
 Emmanuel Episcopal Church (Corry, PA)
 Emmanuel Episcopal Church (Emporium, PA)
 Grace Episcopal Church (Lake City, PA)
 Grace Episcopal Church (Ridgeway, PA)
 Holy Cross Episcopal Church (North East, PA)
 Memorial Church of Our Father (Foxburg, PA)
 St. Agnes Episcopal Church (St. Marys, PA)
 St. Andrews Church (Clearfield, PA)
 St. Augustine of Canterbury Church (Edinboro, PA)
 St. Clement's (Greenville, PA)
 St. Francis of Assisi Episcopal Church (Youngsville, PA)
 St. James Memorial Episcopal Church (Titusville, PA)
 St. Johns Episcopal Church (Kane, PA)
 St. Johns Episcopal Church (Sharon, PA)
 St. Johns Episcopal Church (Franklin, PA)
 St. Joseph Church (Allegany, PA)
 St. Lawrence & Valley Mission (Osceola Mills, PA)
 St. Luke's Episcopal Church (Smethport, PA)
 St. Marks Episcopal Church (Erie, PA)
 St. Mary's Episcopal Church (Erie, PA)
 St. Peters Church (Waterford, PA)
 St. Stephens Episcopal Church (Fairview, PA)
 Trinity Church (New Castle, PA)
 Trinity Memorial Church (Warren, PA)

References

External links

Journal of the Annual Convention, Diocese of Erie
Episcopal Asset Map

Northwestern Pennsylvania
Diocese of Northwestern
Province 3 of the Episcopal Church (United States)